Edwin Charles "Teddy" Daw (23 January 1875 – 1944) was an English professional footballer who played as a goalkeeper.

References

1875 births
1944 deaths
Footballers from Doncaster
English footballers
Association football goalkeepers
Grimsby Town F.C. players
Rushden Town F.C. players
Luton Town F.C. players
Leicester City F.C. players
Gillingham F.C. players
Doncaster Rovers F.C. players
Bradford City A.F.C. players
Oldham Athletic A.F.C. players
Merthyr Town F.C. players
English Football League players